"Psycho" is a song recorded by American rapper and singer Post Malone featuring American singer Ty Dolla $ign. It was released through Republic Records on February 23, 2018, as the third single from Malone's second studio album, Beerbongs & Bentleys (2018). The artists co-wrote the song with Louis Bell, who co-produced it with Malone. Lyrically, the song discusses Malone's lifestyle and explores the theme of excessive fame and trust issues. The song entered at number two on the US Billboard Hot 100 behind Drake's "God's Plan", and reached number one in June 2018, becoming Malone's second and Ty's first chart-topper.

Release and promotion
Malone first teased the song on January 4, 2017, with a video of him playing the song in a studio. Over a year later on February 21, 2018, he previewed the song on Twitter with a 30-second snippet, which highlights his verse. The accompanying artwork features a wolf and a bulldozer, the latter of which has the words "Posty Co." scribed on it. The song comes with its own merch line, featuring three different long sleeve T-shirts.

Composition
According to Billboard and Spin, the song has a slow-moving trap beat and melodically bears a resemblance to Post Malone's 2015 song "White Iverson".

Critical reception
Sheldon Pearce of Pitchfork deemed the song a combination of "some of the least interesting raps you could possibly imagine" and "a downer that won't quit", writing that it "uses concepts that have been played out in hip-hop for years". Patrick Hosken of MTV News opined that the song "finds a late-night vibe that, away from the madness of crunching guitars, unfolds like a chill celebration of luxury". Mitch Findlay of HotNewHipHop wrote that it "continues the formula set by" Post Malone's previous single "Rockstar", and that they share "a few melodic similarities", describing "Psycho" as "more subdued" in comparison. The track was named the worst song of 2018 by Time.

Music video
The official music video for "Psycho" was released on March 22, 2018, on Post Malone's Vevo YouTube channel. It was directed by James DeFina. It features Malone riding on a FV103 Spartan armored personnel carrier, fighting a wolf with a flamethrower, and Malone with Sign amidst the wreckage of ruined aircraft. As of August 2022, the video has received more than 960 million views on YouTube.

Credits and personnel
Credits adapted from Tidal.
 Post Malone – production, programming, vocals
 Ty Dolla Sign – vocals
 Louis Bell – production, programming, record engineering, vocal production
 Manny Marroquin – mixing

Charts

Weekly charts

Year-end charts

Decade-end charts

Certifications

Release history

References

2018 songs
2018 singles
Post Malone songs
Ty Dolla Sign songs
Billboard Hot 100 number-one singles
Canadian Hot 100 number-one singles
Number-one singles in Australia
Number-one singles in Sweden
Republic Records singles
Songs written by Post Malone
Songs written by Ty Dolla Sign
Songs written by Louis Bell
Song recordings produced by Louis Bell
Song recordings produced by Post Malone